Wade Hampton State Office Building is a historic state office building located at Columbia, South Carolina. It was built between 1938 and 1940, and is a large six-story building in a restrained Neoclassical style, with Art Deco inspired details. It held the offices of the Attorney General and the Department of Education, who embodied the state's policy of racial segregation.  The building was also designed with segregated spaces for African American patrons conducting business there.

It was added to the National Register of Historic Places in 2007.

References

African-American history of South Carolina
Government buildings on the National Register of Historic Places in South Carolina
Neoclassical architecture in South Carolina
Government buildings completed in 1940
Buildings and structures in Columbia, South Carolina
National Register of Historic Places in Columbia, South Carolina
1940 establishments in South Carolina